John Lamb is an American artist and entrepreneur.

Lamb created among the first animated surfing and skateboarding cartoons, and perhaps the first American animated, rotoscoped music video. In 1979, the Academy of Motion Picture Arts and Sciences presented Lamb with an Academy Award for Scientific and Technical Achievement for co-invention of the Lyon Lamb Video Animation System (VAS).

In the early 1970s, Lamb's animation appeared in two seminal surf movies. The Forgotten Island of Santosha by Larry and Roger Yates featured Lamb's first animated film Secret Spot (1974), while Five Summer Stories by McGillivray-Freeman Films (1975) featured Lamb's animated short Rocket 88.

Secret Spot introduced Lamb's trademark character Willy Makitt.  Notable for another first, Secret Spot features an "air" maneuver where the surfer flies out of the wave into the air and lands back on the wave to continue surfing - a trick now standard in the world surf community. Rocket 88 also features Willie Makitt doing a "shuvit" maneuver, which would later become a standard trick among skateboarders. The "shuvit" maneuver shows Willy Makitt kick-flipping the surfboard, causing it to spin - he then lands it to continue the ride. In 1975, Willy Makitt was licensed by Hang Ten and featured on their fiberglass skateboards, which can be seen in an NBC newscast on the "new" skateboarding phenomenon.

Most recently, Lamb and Secret Spot were honored by the California Surf Museum in Oceanside, CA with a permanent installation. Hand painted by Lamb, with a bigger-than-life wave scene and classic hot rod, tikis, palm trees and jungle scene, the iconic Willy Makitt is featured at the peak of the giant wave. The Secret Spot installation plays host to art openings, premieres and surf extravaganzas of all types at the groundbreaking museum. The installation also features the work of Brett Hazzard, who created the "footprints in the sand" and breathtaking beach effect, that completes the installation's unique experience. See the mural's start and sky-bending finish on YouTube.

History

With the fresh success of the Lyon Lamb Video Animation System in 1976, Lamb set out for his most ambitious animation project: Tom Waits for No One, featuring Tom Waits singing "The One That Got Away" from his LP Small Change. Using the newly invented Lyon Lamb Video Rotoscope, Lamb animated live footage of Tom Waits, creating what appears to be the first American, rotoscoped, animated rock video. Released in 1979, and largely hidden from the public eye since, the video would eventually see a second life when it went viral on YouTube almost 30 years later.

In 1979, Lamb was honored with an Academy Award for Scientific and Technical Achievement for co-inventing the Lyon Lamb Video Animation System (VAS) - (shared with Bruce Lyon). The VAS is a single frame video device for pre-testing animation drawings before they are committed to film for final production.

With the invention of the Lyon Lamb VAS, an animation revolution began. One example, a master animator uses the VAS to demonstrate a human "walk cycle" for his students.

Companies
Lamb is the founder several ventures in widely varied fields, including animation, graphic design, clothing design, licensed apparel, public murals, and most recently his "Blast from the Past" images rendered on aluminum.
 
After leaving Lyon Lamb, throughout the 1980s and early '90s, John Lamb Productions merchandised and licensed Lamb's cartoon-style drawings. During that same period, Lamb also designed apparel for international companies Adidas, Nike, L.A.Gear, Puma, Body Glove, Bugle Boy, Jimmy Z, Maui and Sons, Hang Ten and Bear Surfboards, among others.

In the late '90s, Lamb co-founded Bobtown Ink, with veteran Disney director Russ Mooney, producer Brian Ray and award-winning director John Kafka. They produced and created many original content shows for clients such as Disney, Universal, Nickelodeon, Sun Woo, Hanna-Barbera, Cartoon Network, MGM, and Sony.

Lamb continues his medium bending ways with "Blast from the Past", a series of post-war California-style images of hot rods, surfboards, classic cars and beach scenes set against the backdrop of one of America's most conspicuous images: the atomic plume. Printed on the same type of material from which the Enola Gay was made, the images represent a wistfully ironic commentary of life after the A-bomb. Linksoul Lab in Oceanside, CA hosted the opening for "Blast From the Past" in November, 2013.

Today
In 2015, Lamb published Tom Waits For No One: The Illustrated Scrapbook, a collection of art, photographs and rock n roll artifacts from the making of Tom Waits For No One. The Illustrated Scrapbook is a limited edition hard cover, published independently by Big Buick Press. The book tells the story behind the film, the animators, the music and the artist, Tom Waits.

In 2016, Tom Waits For No One was featured at the 10th Anniversary of Animation Volda, a prominent animation festival Norway (September 22–25, 2016). The film was shown for the first time since 1980, and honored with a gallery opening dedicated to the art, animation cels and drawings from Tom Waits For No One.

References

External links

American film producers
Living people
California State University, Fullerton alumni
Academy Award for Technical Achievement winners
Year of birth missing (living people)
Place of birth missing (living people)